Itwa is a town and tehsil in Siddharthnagar district in Basti division within Indian state of Uttar Pradesh. Itwa is situated 202 km from the state's capital city Lucknow and 26 km from Nepal border.

See also
 Biskohar
 Karhi Khas
 Dokam Amya

References

Cities and towns in Siddharthnagar district